The 6th Cuirassier Regiment was an ancient French cavalry regiment.  It has since merged with the 12th Cuirassier Regiment to form the 6th-12th Cuirassier Regiment.

The French Royal Army
1635: A regiment is raised by Cardinal Richelieu under the name of Régiment de Dragons du Cardinal (the Cardinal's Dragoon Regiment)
1641: On the death of cardinal Richelieu, the Régiment de Dragons du Cardinal passed to the king and was renamed the Régiment de Fusiliers à Cheval du Roi (The King's Regiment of Mounted Fusiliers)
1646: The Régiment de Fusiliers à Cheval du Roi was renamed the Régiment du Roi – Cavalerie or, in English, King's Regiment (Cavalry)

The Revolutionary Wars
In 1791 the Régiment du Roi – Cavalerie was renamed the 6e Régiment de Cavalerie (6th Cavalry Regiment).

In 1800 it took part in the battle of Hohenlinden.

The Napoleonic Wars

In 1803 the 6e Régiment de Cavalerie is turned into a cuirassiers regiment and took the name 6e Régiment de Cuirassiers (6th Regiment of Cuirassiers).

In 1809 it took part in the battle of Wagram.

In 1812 it took part in the battle of Borodino.

World War 1

The Modern Age
In 1994 it merged with the 12th Cuirassier Regiment to form the 6th-12th Cuirassier Regiment

Honours

Battle honours
 Fleurus 1794
 Hohenlinden 1800
 Wagram 1809
 La Moskowa 1812
 L’Avre 1918
 L’Aisne 1918
 Montdidier 1918

Decorations
 Croix de Guerre 1914–1918 with two palms and one silver gilt star.
 Croix de Guerre 1939–1945 with one palm

Regiments of the French First Republic
Regiments of the First French Empire
20th-century regiments of France
06th
Military units and formations disestablished in 1994
Military units and formations established in 1791